Bettongia moyesi is a fossil species of potoroid marsupial.

Taxonomy
The description of fossil specimens obtained at the Riversleigh World Heritage Area was published by Tim Flannery and Mike Archer in 1987. The specific epithet was proposed by the authors for a chairman of IBM Australia, Allan Moyes, due to the corporation's assistance in transporting large amounts of fossiliferous limestone from Riversleigh to Sydney.

Description
A species of Bettongia that existed in the middle Miocene, inhabiting the rainforest that once dominated the Riversleigh area. The holotype is a largely complete skull and lower jaw discovered at the Two Trees site at Rivesleigh, with another jaw obtained at the nearby Henk's Hollow site being also referred to this species. The diet was omnivorous and like the modern bettongs it consumed truffle-like fungi, although other foods included plant roots and invertebrates discovered while foraging through the forest floor. The estimate of this species' weight is around five kilograms.

References

Bettongia
Riversleigh fauna
Mammals described in 1987